Julian Jakobsen (born 11 April 1987) is a Danish professional ice hockey winger who currently plays as Captain for The Aalborg Pirates of Metal Ligaen (DEN). His sister, Josefine Jakobsen, plays professionally for Djurgårdens IF and has been named Danish Women's Player of the Year twice.

Career statistics

Regular season and playoffs

International

References

External links
 

1987 births
Living people
AaB Ishockey players
Danish ice hockey centres
Hamburg Freezers players
Odense Bulldogs players
Sportspeople from Aalborg
Södertälje SK players
Ice hockey players at the 2022 Winter Olympics
Olympic ice hockey players of Denmark